Mille Lacs may refer to:

Lakes
Lac des Mille Lacs in Ontario, Canada
Mille Lacs Lake in Minnesota, United States

Native American
Mille Lacs Band of Ojibwe
Mille Lacs Indian Museum
Mille Lacs Indian Reservation
Mille Lacs Indians

Protected Areas
Mille Lacs Kathio State Park in Minnesota, United States
Mille Lacs National Wildlife Refuge in Minnesota, United States

Settlements
Mille Lacs County, Minnesota, United States

Other
Mille Lacs County Courthouse